IC 1838 (also known as MCG+03-08-002 or LEDA 10389) is a spiral galaxy of type Sc. It lies in the Taurus constellation, 471 million light years away from Earth. It has a diameter of 13,046.5 light years and a thickness of 1,304.7 light years.

References

External links
Deep-Sky Catalogue

Unbarred spiral galaxies
Taurus (constellation)
1838
10389
+03-08-002